Heywood F.C. was an English association football club based in Heywood, Lancashire. The club was a founder member of the Lancashire League in 1889. In the 1891–92 season, Heywood made their first appearance in the FA Cup, reaching the Second Qualifying Round. They left the Lancashire League in 1892 after finishing bottom of the table with only one win from 22 matches. The club joined the Lancashire Combination in 1902 and finished 12th in the division. However, the following season Heywood left the league midway through the campaign and their records were expunged.

References
Heywood at the Football Club History Database
FA Cup results archive at TheFA.com

Defunct football clubs in England
Heywood, Greater Manchester
Lancashire League (football)
Lancashire Combination
West Lancashire Football League
Defunct football clubs in Lancashire
Defunct football clubs in Greater Manchester
Association football clubs disestablished in 1904
Association football clubs established in 1889